The Ad Hoc Configuration Protocol (AHCP) is an autoconfiguration protocol for IPv6 and dual-stack IPv6/IPv4 networks designed to be used in place of router discovery and DHCP on networks where it is difficult or impossible to configure a server within every link-layer broadcast domain, for example mobile ad hoc networks.

AHCP will automatically configure IPv4 and IPv6 addresses, name servers and NTP servers. It will not configure default routes, since it is designed to be run together with a routing protocol (such as Babel or OLSR).

External links
 AHCP development home page
 Internet draft for the Ad Hoc Configuration Protocol

IPv6
Application layer protocols